The Madonna with Child, or Alzano Madonna, is an oil on panel painting by Italian Renaissance artist Giovanni Bellini, executed around 1485.

History 
The work has been in Bergamo since as early as the 16th century, where it likely arrived as part of the dowry of Lucrezia Agliardi, who had been abbess in the monastery of Alzano Lombardo, whence the name.

After several passages of ownership, in 1891 it was donated to the current museum.

Description 
In this picture, Bellini represented the traditional theme of Mary and Child Jesus as busts in the foreground, above a hanging tapestry resembling the thrones with baldachin which were commons in the contemporary sacred conversations. At the sides is a landscape with towers, castles and small figures, as typical in the artist's production.

In the foreground is a red marble parapet where is the usual cartouche with Bellini's signature. There is also a fruit, perhaps a reference to the original sin, or an emblem of the Virgin derived from holy books or hymns.

This Madonna is generally considered a model of later works, such as the Madonna of the Red Cherubims or the Madonna of the Small Trees, both in the Accademia Carrara.

References 

 

Paintings of the Madonna and Child by Giovanni Bellini
1480s paintings
Collections of the Accademia Carrara